The Ankleshwar–Rajpipla Passenger is a Passenger train belonging to Western Railway zone that runs between  and . It is currently being operated with 59167/59168 train numbers on a daily basis.

Average speed and frequency 
 The 59167/Ankleshwar–Rajpipla Passenger runs with an average speed of 23 km/h and completes 63 km in 2h 45m. The 59168/Rajpipla–Ankleshwar Passenger runs with an average speed of 23 km/h and completes 63 km in 2h 45m.

Route and halts 
The important halts of the train are:

Coach composite 
The train has standard ICF rakes with max speed of 110 kmph. The train consists of 7 coaches:

 5 General Unreserved
 2 Seating cum Luggage Rake

Traction
Both trains are hauled by a Vatva Loco Shed-based WDM-3A diesel locomotive from Ankleshwar to Rajpipla and vice versa.

See also 
 Ankleshwar Junction railway station
 Rajpipla railway station

Notes

References

External links 
 59167/Ankleshwar–Rajpipla Passenger India Rail Info
 59168/Rajpipla–Ankleshwar Passenger India Rail Info

Rail transport in Gujarat
Slow and fast passenger trains in India
Railway services introduced in 2014
Transport in Ankleshwar